Phymatopterella is a genus of flies in the family Phoridae.

Species
P. pallidifrons Borgmeier, 1926
P. luteiclava Borgmeier, 1971
P. ovatimacula Barnes, 1990
P. pallidifrons (Borgmeier, 1926)
P. shannoni Brues, 1933
P. submaculata Borgmeier, 1971
P. uniseriata Borgmeier, 1971

References

Phoridae
Platypezoidea genera